The 2016 Rally di Sardegna (formally the 13º Rally Italia Sardegna) was the sixth round of the 2016 World Rally Championship. The race was held over four days between 9 June and 12 June 2016, and was based in Alghero, Sardinia, Italy. Hyundai's Thierry Neuville won the race, his 2nd win in the World Rally Championship.

Entry list

Overall standings

Special stages

Power Stage

References

Sardegna
Rally Italia Sardegna
Sardegna Rally